All Saints’ Church, South Wingfield is a Grade II* listed parish church in the Church of England in South Wingfield, Derbyshire.

History
 
The church dates from the 12th century. The aisle and nave windows were redone in 1803 and the chancel was refashioned in 1877. The font dates from the 12th century. Some stained glass windows in the clerestory are by John Hayward.

The church is in a joint parish with St Mary's Church, Crich.

Monuments
Immanuel Halton (d. 1699)
William Harris (d. 1631)
Revd. Miles Halton (d. 1792)
Immanuel Halton (d. 1784)

References

Church of England church buildings in Derbyshire
Grade II* listed churches in Derbyshire